Santa Fe Trail - Saline County Trail Segments are four historic Santa Fe Trail segments located near Stanhope, Saline County, Missouri. The four trail rut segments are located on the Weinrich farm.  They date to 1821–1827.

It was added to the National Register of Historic Places in 1994.

References

Santa Fe Trail
Roads on the National Register of Historic Places in Missouri
Buildings and structures in Saline County, Missouri
National Register of Historic Places in Saline County, Missouri